"Boy-Scoutz 'n the Hood" is the eighth episode of the fifth season of the American animated television series The Simpsons. It originally aired on the Fox network in the United States on November 18, 1993. In the episode, Bart, intoxicated from an all-syrup Squishee, mistakenly joins the Junior Campers, a Boy Scout-style organization. Homer and Bart join a father-son rafting trip which goes awry when they are stranded at sea.

The episode was written by Dan McGrath and directed by Jeffrey Lynch. Ernest Borgnine guest starred in the episode as himself. He recorded his lines at the Village Recorder in West Los Angeles. The episode makes cultural references to the films My Dinner with Andre, The Terminator, On the Town, "Crocodile" Dundee, Deliverance, Friday the 13th, and Boyz n the Hood (in the title) as well as the song "Sugar, Sugar" by The Archies. Since airing, the episode has received mostly positive reviews from television critics. It acquired a Nielsen rating of 13.0, and was the highest-rated show on the Fox network the week it aired.

Plot
Bart and Milhouse find $20 that Homer lost and order a Super Squishee made entirely of syrup from Apu at the Kwik-E-Mart. With their senses reeling from the high sugar content, they spend the rest of the money on a bender in Springfield. The next morning, Bart wakes up with a hangover and realizes he joined the Junior Campers, an organization like the Boy Scouts, during his revelry.

Bart plans to quit the group as soon as possible, but he attends a meeting to avoid a pop quiz at school. When he learns that Junior Campers are issued pocket knives, he keeps attending meetings. Homer mocks him relentlessly for embracing the scouts. When a father-son rafting trip is planned, neither Bart nor Homer wish to go together. They offer invitations to each other thinking they will both refuse them, but inadvertently end up agreeing to attend. Homer is distressed when he learns that he and Bart will share a raft with Ned and his son Rod.

When Homer loses the map after folding it into a makeshift hat that blows away, they paddle the wrong way and find themselves lost at sea. Their plan to ration the little food onboard fails when Homer greedily eats most of it. They are stranded with no food or water for several days; the Springfield Police Department refuses to search for them because their rescue boat is out of refreshments. The raft springs a leak after Homer accidentally drops a pocket knife he was intending to gift to Bart. All seems lost, but Homer smells the scent of food from a Krusty Burger on an unmanned offshore oil rig and places a large order. Bart is proud of his father after the rafting party survives their ordeal.

Led by Ernest Borgnine, the other Junior Campers take the right route but suffer a worse fate: they become trapped in a dark, tangled swamp while being hunted by mountain men. Borgnine is unable to repel a bear attack because Homer has stolen his Swiss Army knife (the same one that punctured Homer's raft), so they flee to an abandoned summer camp. They start singing campfire songs, but soon 
an unseen figure lurking in the woods (implied to be Jason Vorhees) attacks them and the episode ends with Borgnine screaming.

Production

"Boy-Scoutz 'n the Hood" was written by Dan McGrath and directed by Jeffrey Lynch. The episode was recorded at the Village Recorder in West Los Angeles. Ernest Borgnine guest starred in the episode as himself. The staff liked his work on the films Marty and From Here to Eternity, so they asked him to do a guest appearance on the show. Borgnine felt he could not say no to the offer because his grandchildren were fans of the show. In the final scene of the episode, Borgnine plays a guitar and sings campfire songs with the children. Borgnine was a guitar player in real life, so he brought his own guitar with him to the recording studio. Borgnine apologized because he felt that he was not being able to sing very well, but Nancy Cartwright, who provides the voice of Bart, thought his voice "added to the authenticity of his character". The Simpsonss creator Matt Groening thought the recording sessions with Borgnine were "so much fun". Hank Azaria, who provided the voice of Apu, commented that Borgnine "had no idea what the hell he was doing. He's a good actor, and he read his lines just fine, but he had no idea what the show was, no idea what we were doing."

In her book My Life as a 10-Year-Old Boy, Cartwright comments that she was a fan of Borgnine's performance in Marty. She writes that the film had "changed [her] forever", and that it made her "realize that actors have the power through their work to inspire and enlighten others." She recalls that when Borgnine arrived for the recording session, she "lost all coolness" and ran up to him and exclaimed "ohmygod, Marty!"

Cultural references
When Bart and Milhouse visit the local video arcade at the beginning of the episode, Martin Prince is seen playing an arcade game based on the 1981 film My Dinner with Andre. Other games at the arcade include a game based on the 1984 film The Terminator. The "Springfield, Springfield" number performed by Bart and Milhouse on their night out in town is a reference to the musical number "New York, New York" from the film On the Town, starring Gene Kelly and Frank Sinatra. During a scene in which Hans Moleman and Moe fight with knives, Hans tells Moe, "You call that a knife? This is a knife!", a reference to a line from the 1986 film "Crocodile" Dundee.  Ernest Borgnine introduces himself a la Troy McClure to the Junior Campers by recalling his role in From Here to Eternity, a film which modern children are unlikely to have seen. As Homer daydreams, he sings the song "Sugar, Sugar" by The Archies. While on the raft, Homer misquotes lines from Samuel Taylor Coleridge's The Rime of the Ancient Mariner when he says "Water, water everywhere/So let's all have a drink." The scene in which Borgnine and the other rafters drift through a dark forest watched by mountain men is a reference to a scene in the 1972 film Deliverance, and the scene features the music from the film's "Dueling Banjos" scene. The unseen person or creature that attacks Borgnine at the end of the episode is implied to be Jason Voorhees from the Friday the 13th film series.

Reception

Critical reception
Since airing, the episode has received mostly positive reviews from television critics. The authors of the book I Can't Believe It's a Bigger and Better Updated Unofficial Simpsons Guide, Warren Martyn and Adrian Wood, wrote: "A terrific episode, with Homer so stupid it isn't true, yet still saving the day. Seeing Ned Flanders get it wrong is great, but the show-stealer is a toss-up between Borgnine's great self-deprecating role, the ironic seagull, and the dolphins." DVD Movie Guide's Colin Jacobson called it a "brilliant episode from start to finish". He commented that "We see what an amazing amount of goods and services one can purchase in Springfield with only $20, and we get a fun spoof of scouting. Add to that terrific rivalry moments between Bart and Homer and the show excels." Patrick Bromley of DVD Verdict called the plot of the episode "typically inspired", and gave it a grade of A. Bill Gibron of DVD Talk gave the episode a score of 5 out of 5. TV DVD Reviews's Kay Daly wrote: "And just when you think the Simpsons''' creators have taken parody as far as it can go, they air an episode like this. The writers cram the 22-minute episode with allusions to movie genres including disaster movies, Broadway musicals, adventure-suspense and classic teen horror." Adam Suraf of Dunkirkma.net named it one of his ten favorite episodes of the show. He called the musical sequence a "classic". Rick Porter of Zap 2 It wrote in that he was not a "fan" of the episode's second half: "Despite the presence of Borgnine, Homer is a little too aggressively stupid for my taste". He thought the first part was "absolutely brilliant", though.

Kurt M. Koenigsberger analyzed a scene from the episode in his piece "Commodity Culture and Its Discontents", published in the compilation work Leaving Springfield: The Simpsons and the Possibility of Oppositional Culture edited by John Alberti. He commented that The Simpsons literary and cultural awareness extends to the "conventions of its own medium" in this episode. Bart criticizes an Itchy & Scratchy episode because Itchy stakes down Scratchy's appendages and props his belly to form a tent with faulty knots. With Homer looking on from the couch, Lisa reminds Bart that cartoons do not simply reproduce reality, a point hammered on as a second Homer meanders past the living-room window. Koenigsberger said that "this moment and many others like it reveal a strong sense of self-awareness within the show, an awareness especially characteristic of high modernism."

In the United Kingdom, when the 300th episode was shown, Sky 1 held a Golden D'ohnuts evening, in which viewers voted for their favorite episodes to win in each category. This episode won the category of: Best School Jinx''.

Ratings
In its original American broadcast, "Boy-Scoutz 'n the Hood" finished 35th in the ratings for the week of November 15 to 21, 1993, with a Nielsen rating of 13.0, translating to 12.3 million households. The episode was the highest-rated show on the Fox network that week.

References

External links

 

The Simpsons (season 5) episodes
1993 American television episodes
Scouting in popular culture